Sofara is a small town and seat (chef-lieu) of the rural commune of Fakala in the Cercle of Djenné in the Mopti Region of southern-central Mali.

The town lies on the right bank of the Bani River. A weekly market is held in the town on Tuesdays that serves the settlements in the region.

References

External links

Populated places in Mopti Region